Frank von Zerneck (born November 4, 1940) is an American television producer.

Career
Zerneck's career began as a theater producer in Los Angeles, but moved to television  in 1975 in a collaboration with Robert Greenwald through Moonlight Productions, which resulted in the Emmy nominated docudrama 21 Hours at Munich. They briefly partnered with former ABC employee Stu Samuels in the mid to late 1980s. In 1987 Zerneck and fellow producer Robert M. Sertner created von Zerneck/Sertner Films, a long-term venture which has resulted in nearly a hundred television films. Of the company's most notable productions are four Native American films produced for Turner Network Television between 1993 and 1996, which included the Emmy winning Geronimo, Crazy Horse, and Golden Globe nominated Lakota Woman. Tecumseh, which concluded the series, was also critically acclaimed. Recent productions have largely consisted of disaster and true crime dramas.

References

External links

1940 births
Living people
American television producers